Polypoetes aniplata is a moth of the family Notodontidae. It is found along the eastern slope of the Andes, at elevations between 1,400 and 1,800 meters, from southern
Peru south to northern Bolivia.

References

Moths described in 1906
Notodontidae of South America